Three Locks is an unincorporated community in Ross County, in the U.S. state of Ohio.

Three Locks was located on the Ohio and Erie Canal.

References

Unincorporated communities in Ross County, Ohio
Unincorporated communities in Ohio